Nipradilol is a beta blocker and nitric oxide donor.

References

Beta blockers
Nitrate esters
Isopropylamino compounds
Secondary alcohols
Secondary amines
Phenol ethers